Zarb may refer to:
a common Maltese surname.  Zarb is a Semitic name, and is phonetically similar to other names in Middle Eastern countries such as the Lebanese "Harb".

Surname 
Frank Zarb (born 1935), American businessman and former Republican politician
John Zarb, an Australian conscientious objector to military service during the Vietnam War
Romilda Baldacchino Zarb, Maltese politician
Tony Zarb, the secretary general of the Maltese General Workers' Union (GWU)
John A. Zarb, American businessman and former Chairman, Mercy Memorial Hospital System

Places 
Frank G. Zarb School of Business at Hofstra University
Kalleh Zarb
Zarb Ali

Music 
Zarb, or tonbak, a Persian percussion instrument.

Military
Operation Zarb-e-Azb, a military operation conducted by the Pakistani military
Zarb (missile), the Pakistani name for the YJ-62 anti-ship missile